The 1993 Greenlandic Men's Football Championship was the 23rd edition of the Greenlandic Men's Football Championship. The final round was held in Qaqortoq. It was won by B-67 Nuuk for the first time in its history.

First round

Capital Region

Second round

North Greenland

Disko Bay

Central Greenland

South Greenland
Nagtoralik Paamiut and Siuteroq Nanortalik-43 qualified for the final Round.

NB Kissaviarsuk-33 qualified for the final Round as hosts.

Final round

Pool 1

Pool 2

Playoffs

Semi-finals

Seventh-place match

Fifth-place match

Third-place match

Final

See also
Football in Greenland
Football Association of Greenland
Greenland national football team
Greenlandic Men's Football Championship

References

Greenlandic Men's Football Championship seasons
Green
Green
Foot